The MacBook Air is a line of laptop computers developed and manufactured by Apple since 2008. It features a thin, light structure in a machined aluminum case and a 13-inch screen. The Macbook Air's lower prices relative to the larger, higher performance MacBook Pro have made it Apple's entry-level notebook since the discontinuation of the original MacBook line in 2011.

The MacBook Air was introduced in January 2008 as a premium ultraportable with a 13.3-inch screen and a full-size keyboard, and was promoted as the world's thinnest notebook, opening a laptop category known as the ultrabook family. With its slim design, it attracted attention for not including an optical disc drive, and having fewer ports than was typical for laptops at the time. 

In 2010 the MacBook Air was redesigned with a tapered chassis, and Apple released a smaller 11.6-inch version. Solid-state storage was made standard, and later revisions added Intel Core i5 or i7 processors and Thunderbolt. In 2018 the Air was given a smaller footprint, gained a high-resolution Retina display, and combination USB-C/Thunderbolt 3 ports for data and power. The smaller 11-inch model was discontinued in 2019. In 2020, Apple shifted the MacBook Air to their new Apple-designed M1 processor (see MacBook Air with Apple silicon).

The latest MacBook Air was redesigned away from the tapered body in 2022 to match the latest MacBook Pro models, and upgraded to the M2 processor. The new model was given a larger 13.6-inch screen and brought back MagSafe, now the third iteration of Apple's magnetic laptop charger ports.

Intel-based

Original (2008–2009) 

Steve Jobs introduced the MacBook Air during Apple’s keynote address at the 2008 Macworld conference on January 15, 2008. It featured a custom Intel Merom CPU and Intel GMA GPU which were 40% as big as the standard chip package. It also featured an anti-glare LED backlit display, a full-size keyboard, and a large trackpad that responded to multi-touch gestures such as pinching, swiping, and rotating.

The MacBook Air was the first subcompact notebook offered by Apple after the 12" PowerBook G4 discontinued in 2006. It was also Apple's first computer with an optional solid-state drive. It was however the final Mac to use a PATA storage drive, and the only one with an Intel CPU. To conserve on space, it uses the 1.8 inch drive used in the iPod Classic instead of the typical 2.5-inch drive. It was Apple's first notebook since the PowerBook 2400c without a built-in removable media drive. To read optical disks, users could either purchase an external USB drive such as Apple's SuperDrive or use the bundled Remote Disc software to access the drive of another computer wirelessly that has the program installed. The MacBook Air also did without a FireWire port, Ethernet port, line-in, and a Kensington Security Slot.

On October 14, 2008, a new model was announced with a low-voltage Penryn processor and Nvidia GeForce graphics. Storage capacity was increased to a 128 GB SSD or a 120 GB HDD, and the micro-DVI video port was replaced by the Mini DisplayPort. The disk drive was also changed from a PATA drive to the faster SATA drive.

A mid-2009 revision featured slightly higher battery capacity and a faster Penryn CPU.

Redesign (2010–2017) 

, Apple released a redesigned 13.3-inch model with a tapered enclosure, higher screen resolution, improved battery, a second USB port, stereo speakers, and standard solid state storage. An 11.6-inch model was introduced, offering reduced cost, weight, battery life, and performance relative to the 13.3-inch model, but better performance than typical netbooks of the time. Both 11-inch and 13-inch models had an analog audio output/headphone minijack supporting Apple earbuds with a microphone. The 13-inch model received a SDXC-capable SD Card slot.

On July 20, 2011, Apple released updated models, which also became Apple's entry-level notebooks due to lowered prices and the discontinuation of the white MacBook around the same time. The mid-2011 models were upgraded with Sandy Bridge dual-core Intel Core i5 and i7 processors, Intel HD Graphics 3000, backlit keyboards, Thunderbolt, and Bluetooth was upgraded to v4.0. Maximum storage options were increased up to 256 GB. This revision also replaced the Expose (F3) key with a Mission Control key, and the Dashboard (F4) key with a Launchpad key.

On June 11, 2012, Apple updated the line with Intel Ivy Bridge dual-core Core i5 and i7 processors, HD Graphics 4000, faster memory and flash storage speeds, USB 3.0, an upgraded 720p FaceTime camera, and a thinner MagSafe 2 charging port. The standard memory was upgraded to 4 GB, with a maximum configuration of 8 GB.

On June 10, 2013, Apple updated the line with Haswell processors, Intel HD Graphics 5000, and 802.11ac Wi-Fi.  Storage started at 128 GB SSD, with options for 256 GB and 512 GB. The Haswell considerably improved battery life from the previous generation, and the models were capable of 9 hours on the 11-inch model and 12 hours on the 13-inch model; a team of reviewers exceeded expected battery life ratings during their test.

In March 2015, the models were refreshed with Broadwell processors, Intel HD Graphics 6000, Thunderbolt 2, and faster storage and memory.

In 2017 the 13-inch model received a processor speed increase from 1.6 GHz to 1.8 GHz and the 11-inch model was discontinued. The 2017 model remained available for sale after Apple launched the next generation in 2018. It was discontinued in July 2019. Before its discontinuation it was Apple's last notebook with USB Type-A ports, a non-Retina display, and a backlit rear Apple logo.

Retina (2018–2020) 

 Apple released a new MacBook Air with Amber Lake processors, a 13.3-inch Retina display with a resolution of 2560×1600 pixels, Touch ID, and two combination USB-C 3.1 gen 2/Thunderbolt 3 ports plus one audio jack. The screen displays 48% more color and the bezels are 50% narrower than the previous generation, and occupies 17% less volume. It was available in three finishes, silver, space gray, and gold. Unlike the previous generation, this model couldn't be configured with an Intel Core i7 processor, possibly because Intel never released the i7-8510Y CPU that would have been used.

The base 2018 model came with 8 GB of 2133 MHz LPDDR3 RAM, 128 GB SSD, Intel Core i5 processor (1.6 GHz base clock, with Turbo up to 3.6 GHz) with Intel UHD Graphics 617.

Apple released updated models in July 2019 with True Tone display technology and an updated  butterfly keyboard using the same components as the 2019 MacBook Pro. A test found that the 256 GB SSD in the 2019 model has a 35% lower read speed than the 256 GB SSD in the 2018 model, though the write speed is slightly faster.

Updated models were released in March 2020 with Ice Lake Intel Core i3, i5 and i7 processors, updated graphics, support for 6K output to run the Pro Display XDR and other 6k monitors, and replaced the butterfly keyboard with a Magic Keyboard design similar to that initially found in the 2019 16-inch MacBook Pro.

Apple silicon

M1 (2020) 

On November 10, 2020, Apple announced the MacBook Air with an Apple-designed M1 processor, and with the same design as the one introduced in 2018, launched alongside an updated Mac Mini and 13-inch MacBook Pro as the first Macs with Apple's new line of custom ARM-based Apple silicon processors. The device incorporates a fanless design, the first ever on any MacBook. It also adds support for Wi-Fi 6, USB4 / Thunderbolt 3 and Wide color (P3). The M1 MacBook Air can only run one external display, unlike the previous Intel-based model that was capable of running two 4K displays. The FaceTime camera remains 720p but Apple advertises an improved image signal processor for higher quality video.

The M1 MacBook Air received widespread positive reviews, with reviewers praising the extremely fast performance and long battery life.

As of July 2022, Apple sells the MacBook Air M1 starting at $999 USD.

M2 (2022) 

On June 6, 2022, during the 2022 Worldwide Developers Conference (WWDC), Apple announced their second generation processor, called M2, with an improved performance versus the previous M1 processor. The first computer to receive this new chip was a radically redesigned MacBook Air.

This complete redesign features a dramatically thinner, flat design, doing away with the familiar wedge shape chassis that MacBook Air was most known for having. The new MacBook Air takes on hardware design cues from the 14" and 16" MacBook Pro notebooks released on October 26, 2021, such as a thinner, lighter, flat chassis with 20% less volume than the previous MacBook Air. Other features include MagSafe 3, which also supports fast charging up to 50% in 30 minutes with a 67W or greater power adapter, a taller 13.6" Liquid Retina display with 500 nits max brightness (25% brighter than the previous MacBook Air), a 1080p FaceTime Camera, a three-mic array with advanced beam-forming algorithms, a high-impedance headphone jack, four-speaker sound system with Spatial Audio, full height function keys, and a total of four finishes. Silver, Space Gray, Starlight, a silver-champagne color, and Midnight, a dark blue-black color.

As of July 2022, Apple sells the MacBook Air (Flat Unibody) M2 starting at $1199 USD.

Supported operating systems

macOS 
macOS Ventura, the current release of macOS, will work with Wi-Fi and graphics acceleration on unsupported MacBook Air computers with a compatible patch utility.

Windows through Boot Camp (Intel only) 

Boot Camp Assistant allows Intel Macs to dual-boot Windows. Apple silicon Macs do not support Boot Camp.

Timeline

See also 
 MacBook
 MacBook (12-inch)

Notes

References

External links 

 – official site

Air
Computer-related introductions in 2008
Products introduced in 2008
X86 Macintosh computers
ARM Macintosh computers